Clube Municipal Ananindeua, commonly referred to as Ananindeua, was a Brazilian professional club based in Ananindeua, Pará. The club was founded on 3 January 1978.

History
The town of Ananindeua is in the metropolitan area of Belém. It has approximately 400,000 inhabitants. Ananindeua is the city's main club. The team receives aid from a councilman of Ananindeua, Helder Barbalho, son of Jáder Barbalho. Helder helped the teams to return to the second state division and to contract experienced players.

Record
 1996 – won the second state division championship.
 2001 – runner-up in the second state division championship.
 2006 – finalist in the state championship, the most important tournament in Pará. They were the runners-up, losing the final to Paysandu Sport Club on penalties.

Honours
 Campeonato Paraense Second Division
 Winners (1): 1996

External links
Ananindeua at Arquivo de Clubes
Ananindeua at Futebol do Norte

Association football clubs established in 1978
Ananindeua
Belém
1978 establishments in Brazil